is an LNG-fired thermal power station operated by JERA in the city of Chita, Aichi, Japan. The facility is located on reclaimed land at the east side of Ise Bay. It is located about three kilometers northeast of the Chita Thermal Power Station.

History
The Chita Daini Thermal Power Station began operations LNG-fired power plant operated by Chubu Electric in September 1983. From 1994-1996, both units were converted into a combined cycle power generation system with the addition of an additional gas turbine to use the waste heat of the steam turbine. The existing steam power generation facility can be operated independently even when the gas turbine power generation facility is stopped. The steam turbines were supplied by Toshiba as was the gas turbine for Unit 2. The gas turbine for Unit 1 was supplied by Hitachi. 

In April 2019, the operations of Chubu Electric Power were transferred to JERA, a joint venture between Chubu Electric and TEPCO Fuel & Power, Inc, a subsidiary of Tokyo Electric Power Company.

Plant details

See also 

 Energy in Japan
 List of power stations in Japan

References

External links

official home page

Buildings and structures in Aichi Prefecture
1983 establishments in Japan
Energy infrastructure completed in 1983
Natural gas-fired power stations in Japan
Chita, Aichi
Chubu Electric Power